Goosch.lu is a weekly newspaper published in Luxembourg which is sent electronically or in paper form on a Thursday and is also readable on the Internet. The newspaper says it has 3,500 electronic subscribers. A few hundred copies are printed every week. Goosch.lu is only written by volunteers.

It was first published on June 27, 2003. Since February, 2009, Goosch.lu uses a new layout.

See also 

 List of newspapers in Luxembourg

References 

Luxembourgish-language newspapers
Newspapers published in Luxembourg
Publications established in 2003
2003 establishments in Luxembourg